Aristocles may refer to:
Plato, Greek philosopher whose given name was Aristocles but who became best known by his nickname, Plato.
Aristocles of Messene (fl. 2nd century), Peripatetic philosopher
Aristocles (sculptors)
Aristocles of Pergamum, (c. 155–180 CE) early on devoted to the Peripatetic school, later became a Sophist. Mentioned by Philostratus.